Maladera japonica is a species of scarab beetle in the family Scarabaeidae.

Subspecies
These two subspecies belong to the species Maladera japonica:
 Maladera japonica japonica g
 Maladera japonica korai Miyake & Yamaya, 1995 c g
Data sources: i = ITIS, c = Catalogue of Life, g = GBIF, b = Bugguide.net

References

Further reading

External links

 
 

Melolonthinae
Beetles described in 1860